Malaba, Kenya is a town in Teso North Sub-County, Busia County, on Kenya's western border with Uganda. It sits across the Malaba River, which forms the international border from Malaba, Uganda.

Location 
The coordinates of Malaba, Kenya are: 0°38'07.0"N, 34°16'31.0"E (Latitude:0.635278; Longitude:34.275278).

Overview
The town sits on the main Bujumbura-Mombasa Road, also known as the Northern Corridor, which connects the capitals of four East African Community countries of Burundi, Rwanda, Uganda and Kenya to the Indian Ocean port of Mombasa.

A metre gauge railway, operated by Rift Valley Railways crosses the border in this town. The standard gauge railway from Mombasa is expected to pass through this town.

Malaba and Busia, both border towns between Uganda and Kenya are used by thousands of truck drivers every day. Many of these drivers spend from a few hours to several days at the border while the trucks are loaded with new goods or while customs processes are cleared. This down time is often spent in the company of commercial sex workers.

Population
The 1999 national population census and household enumerated the population of the town at 7,302.

Border crossing
It is expected that in July 2016, the construction of a one-stop-border-crossing between Malaba, Kenya and Malaba, Uganda will conclude.

See also 
 Railway stations in Kenya

References

External links
How (Not) to Cross the Border Overland from Kenya to Uganda

Populated places in Busia County
Kenya–Uganda border crossings
Divided cities